Patrick Christian Funk (born 11 February 1990) is a German professional footballer who plays as a defensive midfielder for TSV Essingen. He is the brother of Marius Funk.

Club career
Funk started his career with FV 08 Unterkochen and joined later to SV Ebnat. He was scouted by SSV Ulm 1846. After several years with SSV Ulm 1846 he moved to the youth team of VfB Stuttgart in summer 2002.

In July 2011, Funk was loaned out to FC St. Pauli until June 2013.

For the 2014–15 season, Funk moved to SV Wehen Wiesbaden.

International career
Funk was a member of the Germany U21.

References

External links
  
 
 

1990 births
Living people
German footballers
Association football midfielders
VfB Stuttgart players
VfB Stuttgart II players
FC St. Pauli players
SV Wehen Wiesbaden players
VfR Aalen players
Germany under-21 international footballers
Germany youth international footballers
Bundesliga players
2. Bundesliga players
3. Liga players
People from Aalen
Sportspeople from Stuttgart (region)
Footballers from Baden-Württemberg
21st-century German people